The 2022 UCI Track Cycling World Championships started on 12 October and finished on 16 October 2022, at the Vélodrome National in Saint-Quentin-en-Yvelines, France.

Schedule
22 events were held.

All times are local (UTC+2).

Medal summary

Medal table

Men

Women

Shaded events are non-Olympic

References

External links
UCI website

 
UCI Track Cycling World Championships by year
World Championships
UCI
UCI
International cycle races hosted by France